Marko Liefke (born July 15, 1974 in Schwerin, Mecklenburg-Vorpommern) is a volleyball player from Germany, who played for the Men's National Team in the 2000s. He played as a wing-spiker, and won the gold medal at the 2001 Summer Universiade.

Honours
2001 FIVB World League — 13th place
2001 Summer Universiade — 1st place
2001 European Championship — 9th place
2002 FIVB World League — 9th place
2003 FIVB World League — 10th place

References
  FIVB biography

1974 births
Living people
German men's volleyball players
Sportspeople from Schwerin
21st-century German people